AdvoCare V100 Bowl may refer to one of the following American college football bowl games:

Independence Bowl
 2009 Independence Bowl (Georgia defeated Texas A&M) 
 2010 Independence Bowl (Air Force defeated Georgia Tech)
 2011 Independence Bowl (Missouri defeated North Carolina)
 2012 Independence Bowl (Ohio defeated Louisiana–Monroe)
 2013 AdvoCare V100 Bowl (Arizona defeated Boston College)

Texas Bowl
 2014 Texas Bowl (Arkansas defeated Texas)
 2015 Texas Bowl (LSU defeated Texas Tech)
 2016 Texas Bowl (Kansas State defeated Texas A&M)